Life Is My Movie Entertainment is a documentary studio founded on January 1, 2011 by Vincent Vittorio based in Los Angeles and Atlanta . The company specializes in developing, producing, acquiring, and distributing non-fiction films.

Founder Vincent Vittorio has been a featured speaker at colleges and universities nationwide and has also been a featured guest on Bloomberg, CBS, Fox Business, MSNBC, C-SPAN, Huffington Post Live, and Fox News among others. On January 1, 2011, Life is My Movie Entertainment was founded and that same year they produced An Inconvenient Tax—distributed by Warner Brothers and released on Netflix. Later that year, the company gained large recognition with the premiere of American Made Movie in New York and Los Angeles. In 2015, - The True Cost  was released on Netflix and became available worldwide in 190 countries, becoming their most successful film to date, and Incarcerating US premiered later that year in Washington D.C. In the beginning of 2020, the company held a worldwide premiere of Record Safari which is scheduled for a release on a streaming platform.

Filmography

References

External links
Official website
Life Is My Movie Entertainment at Internet Movie Database
The True Cost
American Made Movie
An Inconvenient Tax

Film production companies of the United States
Entertainment companies based in California
Companies based in Los Angeles County, California
Companies based in Gwinnett County, Georgia
Entertainment companies established in 2001